Michael Pestronk is CEO and co-founder of Post Brothers Apartments, a property development company in Philadelphia, responsible for the restoration and renovation of the historic Goldtex building in downtown Philadelphia and Rittenhouse Hill, a large residential project in Northwest Philadelphia among other high-profile development projects.

Personal life
Pestronk was born in Alexandria, Virginia in 1980, the son of Deborah and Mark Pestronk. Pestronk moved to the city of Philadelphia in 1999.

Career
Pestronk began his professional career with Historic Landmarks for Living, a privately held, Philadelphia-based development, ownership and management company focused on the preservation and restoration of historically significant buildings. Pestronk was responsible for property and asset management and involved in the operational turnaround of a large portfolio of urban Class A apartments. Pestronk also worked with NWJ Companies, an apartment real estate management company based in Philadelphia.

In 2007, Michael Pestronk, along with his brother Matthew Pestronk, founded Post Brothers Apartments, a vertically integrated operating company specializing in property development throughout the area of Philadelphia.

In 2012, Post Brothers faced opposition from local labor unions when union-affiliated workers were awarded only 40% of the work for the development of the Goldtex apartment project in downtown Philadelphia.

Philadelphia magazine wrote an article describing the union controversy surrounding the Goldtex project. Pestronk explained that the decision to consider non-union labor was not a political move, but an economic decision because the cost of an all-union workforce would be "50 percent more."

Projects
Pestronk has been responsible for managing a number of other notable developments in the Philadelphia area. In 2011, he worked to secure financing for the redevelopment of Rittenhouse Hill, a large multi-family project in Germantown, Philadelphia.

The project would include a number of Green building features becoming the first residential development in the Philadelphia area completely powered by wind-generated power.

In 2012, the company announced the development and refurbishment of the Goldtex building in downtown Philadelphia, with an estimated cost of $40 million. The building has a close proximity to Center City, Philadelphia on the site of a former shoe factory built in 1905. After the announcement of the project, the development received national media attention because of the Pestronks' decision to hire non-union contractors.

Post Brothers purchased a 320,000 square foot, partially vacant office building out of foreclosure for over $27 million in July 2012. Post Brothers is expected to convert the former office building located on 260 South Broad Street in Philadelphia into residential apartments or condominiums.

Accolades
Along with his brother Matthew, Michael Pestronk was part of Philadelphia magazine's 20 Best Philadelphians list.

References

People from Arlington County, Virginia
American real estate businesspeople
Living people
Year of birth missing (living people)